William Fyfe may refer to:

William Fyfe (boatbuilder) (1785–1865), Scottish founder of the Fife & Sons shipyard, grandfather of William Fife#Biography
William Baxter Collier Fyfe (1836–1882), Scottish painter
William Hamilton Fyfe (1878–1965), British–Canadian scholar
William Fyfe (geochemist) (1927–2013), New Zealand geologist
William Patrick Fyfe (born 1955), Canadian serial killer

See also

William Fyffe (disambiguation)
William Fife (disambiguation)